Faaesea Mailo (born February 11, 1978) is a former American football offensive lineman. Mailo attended USC and went undrafted in 2002.

A native of Waialua, Hawaii, he attended Kahuku High & Intermediate School, where he was a football player and sumo wrestler.

References

External links
Pasadena Lancers bio
USC Trojans bio

1978 births
Living people
Players of American football from Torrance, California
American football offensive linemen
USC Trojans football players
New York Jets players